The St. Joseph's Seminary and Church is a seminary and church located in São Lourenço, Macau, China.

History
The seminary was established in 1728 and, following the end of the Jesuits' mission, was taken over by the Lazarites. The church was erected in 1758. In 2005, the church became one of the designated sites of the Historic Centre of Macau enlisted on the UNESCO World Heritage List.

See also
 Religion in Macau
 List of Jesuit sites

References

External links

 Webpage about St. Joseph's Seminary and Church

Roman Catholic churches in Macau
Historic Centre of Macau
Macau Peninsula
Portuguese Macau
Roman Catholic churches completed in 1758
1728 establishments in China
1728 establishments in the Portuguese Empire
18th-century establishments in Macau
Portuguese colonial architecture in China
18th-century Roman Catholic church buildings in China